Van Keith Jakes (born May 10, 1961) is a former professional American football player who played cornerback for six seasons for the Kansas City Chiefs, the New Orleans Saints, and the Green Bay Packers in the National Football League.

Van Jakes is the father of professional soccer player Leigh Jakes.

References 

1961 births
American football cornerbacks
Green Bay Packers players
Kansas City Chiefs players
Kent State Golden Flashes football players
Living people
New Orleans Saints players
People from Phenix City, Alabama
Players of American football from Alabama
Players of American football from Buffalo, New York